A gallop is a beat or rhythm typically used in traditional heavy metal songs.  It is  created by playing an eighth note followed by two sixteenth notes, usually on rhythm guitar, drums, or bass.

One technique on guitar involves strumming palm muted power chords in an up-and-down motion with a pick, thereby creating an ostinato.
Variations include the triplet gallop and the reverse gallop.

On drums, the technique often uses a double kick pedal. A typical drum gallop is formed around this skeleton:
 H- x---x---x---x---|
 S- ----o-------o---|
 B- o-ooo-ooo-ooo-oo|

Examples of early or "proto" gallops

Several early examples are variations on the pattern that do not strictly use the "eighth note followed by two sixteenth notes", but nonetheless have been identified as gallops.
"Hard Lovin' Man"Deep Purple (Deep Purple in Rock, 1970)
"Immigrant Song"Led Zeppelin (Led Zeppelin III, 1970)
"Children of the Grave"Black Sabbath (Master of Reality, 1971)
"Highway Star"Deep Purple (Machine Head, 1972)
"Keep Yourself Alive"Queen (Queen, 1973)

Examples of songs using the gallop

"Achilles Last Stand"Led Zeppelin (Presence, 1976)
"Barracuda"Heart (Little Queen, 1977)
"Exciter"Judas Priest (Stained Class, 1978)
"Stained Class"Judas Priest (Stained Class, 1978)
"Air Dance"Black Sabbath (Never Say Die!, 1978)
"The Oath"Kiss (Music from "The Elder", 1981)
"Killers"Iron Maiden (Killers, 1981)
"Run to the Hills"Iron Maiden (The Number of the Beast, 1982)
"Motorbreath"Metallica (Kill 'Em All, 1983)
"Holy Diver"Dio (Holy Diver, 1983)
"Exciter"Kiss (Lick It Up, 1983)
"Disposable Heroes"Metallica (Master of Puppets, 1986)
"Damage, Inc."Metallica (Master of Puppets, 1986)
"Raining Blood"Slayer (Reign in Blood, 1986)
"Over the Wall"Testament (The Legacy, 1987)
"Headless Cross"Black Sabbath (Headless Cross, 1989)

References
Citations

Sources

Drum patterns
Guitar performance techniques